Magnesium bromide is a chemical compound of magnesium and bromine, with the chemical formula . It is white and deliquescent crystalline solid. It is often used as a mild sedative and as an anticonvulsant for treatment of nervous disorders. It is water-soluble and somewhat soluble in alcohol. It can be found naturally in small amounts in some minerals such as: bischofite and carnallite, and in sea water, such as that of the Dead Sea.

Synthesis
Magnesium bromide can be synthesized by treating with magnesium oxide (and related basic salts) with hydrobromic acid. It can also be made by reacting magnesium carbonate and hydrobromic acids, and collecting the solid left after evaporation.

As suggested by its easy conversion to various hydrates, anhydrous  is a Lewis acid. In the coordination polymer with the formula MgBr2(dioxane)2, Mg2+ adopts an octahedral geometry.

Uses
Magnesium bromide is used as a Lewis acid catalyst in some organic synthesis, e.g., in aldol reaction. In organosilicon chemistry, magnesium bromide forms adducts .

Magnesium bromide also has been used as a tranquilizer. 

Magnesium bromide modifies the catalytic properties of palladium on charcoal. 

Magnesium bromide hexahydrate has properties as a flame retardant. It was found that if 0.125 mol/L of magnesium bromide hexahydrate was added to a cotton material it acted as a flame retardant.

References

Bromides
Magnesium compounds
Alkaline earth metal halides